The Embassy of the United Kingdom in Belgrade is the chief diplomatic mission of the United Kingdom in Serbia. 

The Embassy is located at Resavska 46. 

Sian MacLeod has been the British Ambassador to Serbia since September 2019.

The Embassy also represents the British Overseas Territories in Serbia.

History

The original British legation house in Belgrade was located 22 Gracanicka Ulica however as the importance of the mission grew and the volume of consular and commercial activity it outgrew its building. The embassy move into leased space at No. 42 in the same street in the mid-1930s. After the Second World War this  building was again thoroughly overcrowded. In 1951, the adjacent site at No. 44, was bought from the Serbian government. The lease on No. 42 was given up in the late-1970s. The current Embassy is located at Resavska 46.

Ambassador's residence
During visit of Yugoslav President Tito to Britain in 1953 the foreign secretary, Sir Anthony Eden, spoke to him about the British Embassy's accommodation needs in Belgrade and, as a result, the Yugoslav government offered a site for a new residence, which was accepted in 1955. 

The British Ambassador's residence in Belgrade, “Elsie Inglis House”, is named after Elsie Inglis, a Doctor and campaigner for women's suffrage and founder of the Scottish Women's Hospitals in Serbia. The renaming ceremony took place on International Women's Day in 2015 and was conducted by the President of Serbia Tomislav Nikolic and then UK Ambassador Denis Keefe.

See also
Serbia–United Kingdom relations
List of diplomatic missions in Serbia
List of ambassadors of the United Kingdom to Serbia

References

Belgrade
Buildings and structures in Belgrade
Serbia–United Kingdom relations
United Kingdom–Yugoslavia relations